Nimitz Class is a naval thriller published in 1997 by Patrick Robinson. It is the first book in the series which features admiral Arnold Morgan and Ben Adnam. It is stylistically similar to Tom Clancy, particularly The Hunt for Red October.

Plot summary
In May 2002, a nuclear torpedo attack occurs on the  USS Thomas Jefferson, destroying it. A search commences for the attacking submarine, a Cold War-era . The hunt for the Kilo results in the sinking of the Ayatollah of Iran's submarines by a Navy SEAL raid, an underwater transit through the Bosporus, and an underwater battle near the Falklands. Commander Ben Adnam is a slick commander who eludes capture. He skillfully evades Bill Baldrige and the U.S. Navy.

See also
State-sponsored terrorism

References

External links
 
Google Books

1997 American novels
American thriller novels
Novels about submarine warfare
Novels about terrorism
Novels about nuclear war and weapons